Numberblocks is a British animated television programme for preschoolers that debuted on CBeebies on 23 January 2017. The programme was created by Joe Elliot and produced by Alphablocks Ltd with Blue Zoo. It was commissioned by the British Broadcasting Corporation, with Larkshead Media and Learning Resources holding merchandising rights.

The show follows the Numberblocks, block characters who represent numbers. They live in Numberland and embark on adventures relating to mathematical concepts. In 2017, the show was nominated for a BAFTA award in the "Learning" category.

Premise 
Numberblocks follows the adventures of block characters in Numberland, each named after a number, and made up of the equivalent number of blocks.  A black floating number, called a Numberling, appears above their heads to show their value. When one block hops on top of another, they transform into a different character to make a new number. Many of the numbers have styles and personalities associated with their numbers (One is brave and independent, Seven is rainbow-coloured and lucky, Eight has octopus-like tentacles, etc.)

The show helps toddlers and young kids learn numeracy skills, especially how to count and do simple maths. Integer concepts such as even vs. odd, and factoring are discussed and explored. More sophisticated ideas are also explored in later episodes such as comparison, square numbers, and triangular numbers (known as "Step Squads") as well as counting using binary numbers.

Development 
Kay Benbow of BBC Studios commissioned Numberblocks as an animated series for children aged 3–6 to be developed by Essex production company Blue Zoo. The production was made in partnership with the National Centre for Excellence in the Teaching of Mathematics (NCETM) to complement the Alphablocks series. Created by Joe Elliot, the series was made to give children a deep understanding of how numbers work. Elliot wanted to visually show the concepts of maths in a way no other number series had, as he thought many people struggled with how the subject is taught. In October 2018, Aardman Animations' international sales and acquisitions arm acquired the distribution rights to the show, along with Alphablocks.

Episodes

Series 1 (2017)

Series 2 (2017)

Series 3 (2018–19)

Series 4 (2019)

Series 5 (2021)

Specials (2021-22)

Numbersongs (2019-22)

Other media 
UK-based kids media service company Larkshead Media was appointed to manage licensing activities for Numberblocks in August 2017; the agency announced that merchandise including toys and apparel would be brought to retail. In July 2020, a MathLink Cubes activity set inspired by the show was announced by Learning Resources to be available through major retailers later in the year. The set, featuring characters One to Ten, was delayed and released in June 2021. In September, Immediate Media launched an official magazine for the show, with the first issue released on 8 September 2021. Fancy dress distributor Rubies announced an official dress up licence for Numberblocks in October, with costumes planned to be available in the EMEA and Australia in 2022. Learning Resources secured a global master licensing deal for Numberblocks in November 2021, announcing the release of plush toys in 2022 followed by playsets, video games and classroom items with sister company hand2mind by 2023.

References

External links
 
 
 
 Numberblocks on CBeebies

BBC children's television shows
2017 British television series debuts
2010s British children's television series
Mathematics education television series
British computer-animated television series
British preschool education television series
CBeebies